Blagoy Nakov (born 19 March 1985) is a Bulgarian footballer. He currently plays as a midfielder for Belasitsa Petrich.

Career
Nakov was raised in Belasitsa Petrich's youth teams. So far he has 49 games and 5 goals in the national championship. Nakov is a defensive midfielder, but can also play as a central defender.

In summer 2008 he signed a contract with Pirin Blagoevgrad. In his first season in Pirin, Nakov played 14 matches and scored one goal, on 20 September 2008 against OFC Sliven 2000.

In February 2017, Nakov joined Belasitsa Petrich.

References

External links

Bulgarian footballers
1985 births
Living people
PFC Belasitsa Petrich players
PFC Pirin Blagoevgrad players
OFC Vihren Sandanski players
FC Bansko players
FC Montana players
PFC Lokomotiv Plovdiv players
FC Septemvri Sofia players
First Professional Football League (Bulgaria) players
Association football midfielders
People from Petrich
Sportspeople from Blagoevgrad Province
21st-century Bulgarian people